Felix Francis "Pete" Preboske (January 21, 1914 – February 22, 1994) was an American professional basketball player. He played for the Oshkosh All-Stars in the National Basketball League between 1935 and 1937 and averaged 6.6 points per game.

Some sources list his last name as "Preboski" but online birth records show that a Felix "Preboske" was born in Antigo, Wisconsin on January 21, 1914.

References

1914 births
1994 deaths
American men's basketball players
Basketball players from Wisconsin
Forwards (basketball)
High school basketball coaches in the United States
Oshkosh All-Stars players
People from Antigo, Wisconsin
Wisconsin Badgers men's basketball players